Dawid Johannes van Lill (born 15 February 1957) is a writer, journalist, translator and editor, specialising in the creation of quiz programmes for radio, television, magazines and the Internet. He conceptualised, compiled and presented more than 2 000 episodes of radio quizzes, and compiled questions for a number of TV quizzes.

He contributed the sports section for the South African Encyclopaedia (for MWeb Learning), compiled questions for the previous South African version of Trivial Pursuit, and verified the questions and answers for five series of The Weakest Link. In 1984 and 1986 he was the winner of the popular TV quiz series Flinkdink and he is also the author of several books.
Dawid is currently the CEO of Think Media, a quiz and trivia company.

Life and career 
Dawid van Lill was born in South-West Africa (Namibia) in 1957. He graduated from Stellenbosch University in 1984 with a master's degree in Theology. In 1984 and 1986 he was the winner of the popular TV quiz series Flinkdink. He joined the SABC in 1985, and became a well-known radio personality after his Flinkdink experience. From 1985 to 1997 he was a broadcaster at the SABC, where he created, compiled and presented quiz and trivia programmes for radio.

Dawid van Lill is currently a writer, journalist and broadcaster. He has specialised in the creation and presentation of general knowledge programmes and quiz shows for radio, TV, books, magazines and notable publications for 25 years.

In 1998 Dawid and his wife, Marina, founded Think Media, a research company. In 2000 and 2001, Think Media provided the questions and scripts for quiz programmes such as 100%, Blitsvinnig, and Vat 'n Kans! They also compiled questions for the M-Net sports quiz programme Going for Gold, as well as for two series of the SABC 3 quiz show Greed, e.tv's Mahala on e and he was a consultant and researcher for SABC2's Flinkdink and SABC3's Weakest Link. Think Media provided the questions for the M-Net quiz series Temptation and Are You Smarter than a 5th Grader?
The writing of the Sports section of the South African Encyclopedia (which appeared on M-Web in April 2001) proved to be another major highlight.

Dawid also compiled general knowledge questions for a South African version of Trivial Pursuit. Other achievements include quiz and trivia books, as well as a number of books about Africa, including Amazing Africa, Amazing Animals of Southern Africa, Wonders of African and Man-made Wonders of Africa.
His hobbies include reading, movies, travel, sport and general knowledge.

In 2000 Dawid and his wife, Marina, started a General Knowledge and News quiz programme for schools and the public, called I KNOW!

He also collects books on everything and anything that will enrich one's general knowledge repertoire. He also loves a good whodunit. One of his specialities is the collection of information and books on sports, especially rugby, cricket, athletics and tennis.

“Incurable curiosity is a thousand times better than terminal ignorance.”

Books

TV Quizzes 

Compiled questions

References

External links 
Official website

South African writers
Namibian journalists
1957 births
Living people
Afrikaner people
White Namibian people
Namibian expatriates in South Africa
20th-century South African writers
21st-century South African writers